Workington Bridge railway station was situated at the northern end of Workington Bridge next to the River Derwent, and was originally served by the Cockermouth and Workington Railway, later absorbed by the London and North Western Railway; the road at the north end of the bridge having to be raised to allow the railway to pass under it. It served eastern Workington, Cumberland (now Cumbria), England.

History 
The railway opened on 27 April 1847, but did not originally include a station at Workington Bridge;the only intermediate stations were at Camerton and Brigham. Travellers to Workington were carried into the existing station on the coast line; this was convenient for the harbour, but, as a letter to a local paper promptly pointed out, this meant a long (uphill) trudge to the market place, which could be avoided if trains stopped to let down and pick passengers at the bridge.  The suggestion was soon acted upon, a local paper in June 1847 containing the following paragraph: We are glad to perceive that the letter which appeared in our columns about a month ago, addressed to the Directors of the Cockermouth and Workington Railway, pointing out the great accommodation to the public and the advantages to the company by the establishing of a station at the bridge, near Workington, has had the desired effect. The trains now stop daily at the bridge, where passengers can be booked whether intending to proceed up or down the line. The arrangement is a good one, and we have no doubt but the company will be rewarded for having adopted it - both financially and in the good opinion of the public for having shown so prompt a willingness to meet their wishes
The station closed completely on 1 January 1951.

Afterlife 
By 2015 the station site was obliterated. The bridge which gave the station its name had been rebuilt and had assumed greater importance after it and several neighbours were condemned or destroyed in the 2009 Workington floods.

See also 

 Cockermouth, Keswick and Penrith Railway

References

Sources

Further reading

External links 
 Map of the line with photos RAILSCOT
 The station on an OS map surveyed in 1864 National Library of Scotland
 The station on overlain OS maps surveyed from 1898 National Library of Scotland
 The station on a 1948 OS Map npe maps
 The station Rail Map Online
 The railways of Cumbria Cumbrian Railways Association
 The station Cumbrian Railways Association
 The railways of Cumbria Railways_of_Cumbria
 Cumbrian Industrial History Cumbria Industrial History Society
 Local history of the CKPR route Cockermouth
 The line's and station's Engineer's Line References railwaycodes.org.uk
 A video tour-de-force of the region's closed lines cumbriafilmarchive
 West Cumberland Railtour 5 September 1954 sixbellsjunction

Disused railway stations in Cumbria
Former London and North Western Railway stations
Railway stations in Great Britain opened in 1847
Railway stations in Great Britain closed in 1951
Workington
1847 establishments in England